Dilkea is a genus of flowering plants belonging to the family Passifloraceae.

Its native range is Southern Tropical America.

The genus name of Dilkea is in honour of Sir Charles Wentworth Dilke, 1st Baronet (1810–1869), an English politician. It was published by Maxwell T. Masters in Trans. Linn. Soc. London Vol.27 on page 627 in 1871, after Dilke's death.

Known species:

Dilkea acuminata 
Dilkea clarkei 
Dilkea cuneata 
Dilkea exilis 
Dilkea granvillei 
Dilkea hebes 
Dilkea lecta 
Dilkea margaritae 
Dilkea nitens 
Dilkea ovalis 
Dilkea retusa 
Dilkea tillettii 
Dilkea vanessae

References

Passifloraceae
Malpighiales genera
Plants described in 1871
Flora of South America